Cobra Strike II: Y, Y+B, X+Y <hold> ← is the second album by Buckethead's side project Cobra Strike. In addition to Buckethead and DJ Disk, this album features a completely different cast of musicians.

The term "cobra strike" was inspired by the video game G.I. Joe: Cobra Strike (1983). Artwork for the album features cobras as seen in the game.

The music is similar to their first album, The 13th Scroll and includes several sound samples from movies, most notably El Topo ( «Desert» and «First Master» ) and Phantasm ( « The Funeral » ) .
The title and the content of «Yoshimitsu's Den» is a reference to a game character for the Tekken series of fighting games.

Track listing

Personnel
Buckethead - guitars
SHePz - Bass
Gonervill - beats
O.P. Original Princess - voice
P-Sticks - beats
Travis Dickerson - producer
Buckethead - producer

References

2000 albums